Linda Linqvist (born 3 January 1980) is a retrired Finnish footballer. Linqvist spend most of her career at HJK. Linda Linqvist was capped 12 times by the Finnish women's national team.

International career

Lindström was also part of the Finnish team at the 2005 European Championships.

References

1980 births
Living people
Helsingin Jalkapalloklubi (women) players
FC Honka (women) players
Kansallinen Liiga players
Finnish women's footballers
Finland women's international footballers
Women's association football midfielders